Hem Chetri (born 23 September 2000) is an Indian cricketer. He made his Twenty20 debut on 13 January 2021, for Nagaland in the 2020–21 Syed Mushtaq Ali Trophy. He made his List A debut on 21 February 2021, for Nagaland in the 2020–21 Vijay Hazare Trophy.

References

2000 births
Living people
Indian cricketers
Nagaland cricketers
Place of birth missing (living people)